The Longest Hundred Miles is a 1967 American TV movie. It aired on NBC.

Cast
Doug McClure
Katharine Ross
Ricardo Montalban

Production
The film was shot on location in the Philippines over three months.

Reception
It was the equal sixth highest rated film on US TV, tying with The Doomsday Flight. The first five were The Bridge on the River Kwai, The Robe, Lillies of the Field, Five Branded Women and PT109. Others in the top ten were Blue Hawaii, Fame is the Name of the Game and, equal tenth, Delicate Delinquent and A Summer Place.

References

External links
The Longest Hundred Miles at IMDb
The Longest Hundred Miles at Letterbox DVD

1967 television films
1967 films
American television films
American war films
1967 war films
Films shot in the Philippines
1960s American films